The discography of the Fugees, an American hip hop trio consisting of rapper/singer Lauryn Hill and rappers Pras Michel and Wyclef Jean, consists of two studio albums, three compilation albums, one remix album and nine singles (including one as featured artists) and nine music videos. After the group formed in the 1980s under the name Tranzlator Crew, they signed to Ruffhouse Records and Columbia Records in 1993; they then changed their name to Fugees – an abbreviation of "refugees", also a reference to Haitian immigrants.

The group's debut album, Blunted on Reality, was recorded in 1992 but not released until 1994. The album achieved limited commercial success, only peaking at number 62 on the US Top R&B/Hip-Hop Albums chart: however, it peaked at number 122 on the UK Albums Chart in 1997, and was certified gold by the Syndicat National de l'Édition Phonographique (SNEP). Blunted on Reality spawned three singles: "Boof Baf", "Nappy Heads" and "Vocab". "Nappy Heads" became their first single to appear on the US Billboard Hot 100, charting at number 49. In 1996, the Fugees released their second album, titled The Score. The album achieved significant commercial success in the United States, topping the US Billboard 200, and was later certified seven-times platinum by the Recording Industry Association of America (RIAA). And sold 22 million copies worldwide. It also performed well in several overseas territories, topping the Austrian, Canadian, French, German and Swiss albums charts, whilst also peaking at number two in Sweden and the United Kingdom.

Four commercially successful singles were released from The Score; "Fu-Gee-La", the first single from the album, peaked at number 29 on the Billboard Hot 100 and was certified gold by the RIAA and by the Bundesverband Musikindustrie (BVMI). The other three singles – "Killing Me Softly", "Ready or Not" and "No Woman, No Cry" – did not appear on the Billboard Hot 100 as they were not released for commercial sale, making them ineligible to appear on the chart, although they all received sufficient airplay to appear on the Hot 100 Airplay and Hot R&B/Hip-Hop Airplay charts. "Killing Me Softly", a cover of the Roberta Flack song "Killing Me Softly with His Song", performed strongly in other territories, topping the singles charts in Australia, Austria, Germany and the United Kingdom, among several others. "Ready or Not" also peaked at number one in the United Kingdom and number three in Sweden, and "No Woman, No Cry" – a cover of the Bob Marley & The Wailers song of the same name – topped the singles chart in New Zealand. Fugees collaborated with singer Bounty Killer on the single "Hip-Hopera" and recorded the single "Rumble in the Jungle" for the soundtrack to the film When We Were Kings in 1997. This song samples ABBA's "The Name of the Game" and thought to be the first time ABBA approved a sample of one of their songs.

Although they have not released any studio albums since The Score, a compilation album, Greatest Hits, was released in 2003, and spawned the single "Take It Easy".

Albums

Studio albums

Compilation albums

Remix albums

Singles

As lead artist

As featured artist

Guest appearances

Music videos

As lead artist

As featured artist

Notes

References

External links
 Official website
 
 
 

Discographies of American artists
Hip hop discographies
Rhythm and blues discographies
Discography
Soul music discographies